Harri Laurila (born 30 April 1965) is a Finnish retired ice hockey player, currently serving as assistant coach to the Tampereen Ilves Naiset of the Naisten Liiga. He competed in the men's tournament at the 1992 Winter Olympics.

Career statistics

Regular season and playoffs

International

References

External links
 

1965 births
Living people
Ice hockey people from Tampere
Finnish ice hockey defencemen
Naisten Liiga (ice hockey) coaches
Ässät players
EC Graz players
HPK players
JYP Jyväskylä players
EC KAC players
Kölner Haie players
KOOVEE players
Lahti Pelicans players
Tappara players
HC Thurgau players
EK Zell am See players
Olympic ice hockey players of Finland
Ice hockey players at the 1992 Winter Olympics
Boston Bruins draft picks